Phostria hampsonialis is a moth in the family Crambidae. It was described by Schaus in 1920. It is found in Ghana.

References

Endemic fauna of Ghana
Phostria
Moths described in 1920
Moths of Africa